Paul Courbis (born 3 November 1967), is a French programmer, mostly known for reverse engineering the HP-28 and then the HP 48 series of calculators, and writing multiple articles and books disclosing his findings. These books had a surprising success in France.

Very soon, a team of enthusiasts formed, gathering around Maubert Electronic, a small electronics shop in Paris' Latin Quarter, and developing a large number of utilities and games (one of the most impressing one was Pac-Man for the 48, one of the first programs using the hardware scrolling device of the 48). Most of these programs are still available and can be traced back to the original reverse-engineering published by Paul Courbis.

Paul Courbis is the chief information officer at the French Ordre National des Médecins, he is also working during his spare time on a set of tools to help people administrating Alcatel's PABX (for the 4400 series). He also publishes various tricks (iPhone, shells scripts, etc.) on his web site.

Bibliography 
His main books are available as paperprints on Amazon but are still available on-line for free:

Other works

Published works 
 A HP 48  running on Unix/X11 and used for automatizing the understanding of the 48G internals;
 Courbis is also the conceptor of the website of the first French computer bookstore on the Internet: 
  a set of tools to help people administrating an Alcatel 4400 PABX (website in construction)
 The  for the 
 Some modules for sybtcl:  and

Unpublished works 
 An expandable RPL interpreter written in object-oriented C.

See also 
 HP-28
 HP 48 series
 Saturn (microprocessor)

References

External links 
 HP calculator software library
 Interview of Paul Courbis (in French)
 Maubert Electronique
 Paul Courbis web site (in French)
 Travis Goodspeed's lecture about "Voyage au centre de la HP28C/S" during the Defcon 16 conference (August 2008) - (video)
 

French computer programmers
Living people
1967 births
Chief information officers